Stoney Stretton is a hamlet in Shropshire, England, west of Shrewsbury. It is situated just off the B4386 road (a Roman Road, hence the settlement's name "Stretton") between the villages of Yockleton and Westbury. It lies in the civil parish of Westbury. To the northwest, by the Shrewsbury to Welshpool railway, is the dispersed hamlet of Stretton Heath.

Notable people

See also
Listed buildings in Westbury, Shropshire

References

Villages in Shropshire
Shrewsbury and Atcham